NGC 214 is a spiral galaxy in the northern constellation of Andromeda, located at a distance of  from the Milky Way. It was discovered on September 10, 1784 by William Herschel. The shape of this galaxy is given by its morphological classification of SABbc, which indicates a weak bar-like structure (SAB) at the core and moderate to loosely-wound spiral arms (bc).

The object was not visible on plates taken July 2, so it likely erupted after that date. Designated SN 2005db, it was determined to be a type IIn supernova based on the spectrum. It reached magnitude 17.8 and was designated SN 2006ep. This was determined to be a type-Ib/c supernova.

References

External links
 

Intermediate spiral galaxies
0214
Andromeda (constellation)
Astronomical objects discovered in 1784
002479